The Bern Physiologus (Bern, Burgerbibliothek, Codex Bongarsianus 318) is a 9th-century illuminated copy of the Latin translation of the Physiologus. It was probably produced at Reims about 825–850. It is believed to be a copy of a 5th-century manuscript.  Many of its miniatures are set, unframed, into the text block, which was a characteristic of late-antique manuscripts. It is one of the oldest extant illustrated copies of the Physiologus.

References

Further reading
Stavros Lazaris: "Quelques considérations sur l’illustration du Physiologus grec", in: Bestiaires médiévaux : Nouvelles perspectives sur les manuscrits et les traditions textuelles. Actes du XVe colloque international de la Société Internationale Renardienne, Louvain-la-Neuve, 18-22 août 2003, B. Van den Abeele (ed.), Louvain-la-Neuve, 2005 (Textes, études, congrès 21), pp. 141–167 PDF.
Weitzmann, Kurt, ed., Age of spirituality: late antique and early Christian art, third to seventh century, no. 192, 1979, Metropolitan Museum of Art, New York, ; full text available online from The Metropolitan Museum of Art Libraries

External links

9th-century illuminated manuscripts
Bestiaries
Carolingian illuminated manuscripts